Boleradice is a market town in Břeclav District in the South Moravian Region of the Czech Republic. It has about 900 inhabitants.

History
The first written mention of Boleradice is from 1141.

References

External links

 

Market towns in the Czech Republic
Populated places in Břeclav District
Moravian Slovakia